The Boeing CH-47 Chinook is a tandem rotor helicopter developed by American rotorcraft company Vertol and manufactured by Boeing Vertol. The Chinook is a heavy-lift helicopter that is among the heaviest lifting Western helicopters. Its name, Chinook, is from the Native American Chinook people of Oregon and Washington state.

The Chinook was originally designed by Vertol, which had begun work in 1957 on a new tandem-rotor helicopter, designated as the Vertol Model 107 or V-107. Around the same time, the United States Department of the Army announced its intention to replace the piston-engine–powered Sikorsky CH-37 Mojave with a new, gas-turbine–powered helicopter. During June 1958, the U.S. Army ordered a small number of V-107s from Vertol under the YHC-1A designation; following testing, it came to be considered by some Army officials to be too heavy for the assault missions and too light for transport purposes. While the YHC-1A would be improved and adopted by the U.S. Marine Corps as the CH-46 Sea Knight, the Army sought a heavier transport helicopter, and ordered an enlarged derivative of the V-107 with the Vertol designation Model 114. Initially designated as the YCH-1B, on 21 September 1961, the preproduction rotorcraft performed its maiden flight. In 1962, the HC-1B was redesignated CH-47A under the 1962 United States Tri-Service aircraft designation system.

The Chinook possesses several means of loading various cargoes, including multiple doors across the fuselage, a wide loading ramp located at the rear of the fuselage and a total of three external ventral cargo hooks to carry underslung loads. Improved and more powerful versions of the Chinook have also been developed since its introduction; one of the most substantial variants to be produced was the CH-47D, which first entered service in 1982; improvements from the CH-47C standard included upgraded engines, composite rotor blades, a redesigned cockpit to reduce workload, improved and redundant electrical systems and avionics, and the adoption of an advanced flight control system. It remains one of the few aircraft to be developed during the early 1960s – along with the fixed-wing Lockheed C-130 Hercules cargo aircraft – that has remained in both production and frontline service for over 60 years.

The military version of the helicopter has been exported to nations across the world; the U.S. Army and the Royal Air Force (see Boeing Chinook (UK variants)) have been its two largest users. The civilian version of the Chinook is the Boeing Vertol 234. It has been used by civil operators not only for passenger and cargo transport, but also for aerial firefighting and to support logging, construction, and oil extraction industries.

Design and development

Background

During late 1956, the United States Department of the Army announced its intention to replace the Sikorsky CH-37 Mojave, which was powered by piston engines, with a new, gas turbine-powered helicopter. Turbine engines were also a key design feature of the smaller UH-1 "Huey" utility helicopter. Following a design competition, in September 1958, a joint Army–Air Force source selection board recommended that the Army procure the Vertol-built medium transport helicopter. However, funding for full-scale development was not then available, and the Army vacillated on its design requirements. Some officials in Army Aviation thought that the new helicopter should be operated as a light tactical transport aimed at taking over the missions of the old piston-engined Piasecki H-21 and Sikorsky H-34 helicopters, and be consequently capable of carrying about 15 troops (one squad). Another faction in Army Aviation thought that the new helicopter should be much larger, enabling it to airlift large artillery pieces and possess enough internal space to carry the new MGM-31 "Pershing" missile system.

During 1957, Vertol commenced work upon a new tandem-rotor helicopter, designated as the Vertol Model 107 or V-107. During June 1958, the U.S. Army awarded a contract to Vertol for the acquisition of a small number of the rotorcraft, giving it the YHC-1A designation. As ordered, the YHC-1A possessed the capacity to carry a maximum of 20 troops. Three underwent testing by the Army for deriving engineering and operational data. However, the YHC-1A was considered by many figures within the Army users to be too heavy for the assault role, while too light for the more general transport role. Accordingly, a decision was made to procure a heavier transport helicopter, and at the same time, upgrade the UH-1 "Huey" to serve as the needed tactical troop transport. The YHC-1A would be improved and adopted by the Marines as the CH-46 Sea Knight in 1962. As a result, the Army issued a new order to Vertol for an enlarged derivative of the V-107, known by internal company designation as the Model 114, which it gave the designation of HC-1B. On 21 September 1961, the preproduction Boeing Vertol YCH-1B made its initial hovering flight. During 1962, the HC-1B was redesignated the CH-47A under the 1962 United States Tri-Service aircraft designation system; it was also named "Chinook" after the Chinook people of the Pacific Northwest.

The CH-47 is powered by two Lycoming T55 turboshaft engines, mounted on each side of the helicopter's rear pylon and connected to the rotors by drive shafts. Initial models were fitted with engines rated at  each. The counter-rotating rotors eliminate the need for an antitorque vertical rotor, allowing all power to be used for lift and thrust. The ability to adjust lift in either rotor makes it less sensitive to changes in the center of gravity, important for the cargo lifting and dropping. While hovering over a specific location, a twin-rotor helicopter has increased stability over a single rotor when weight is added or removed, for example, when troops drop from or begin climbing up ropes to the aircraft, or when other cargo is dropped. If one engine fails, the other can drive both rotors. The "sizing" of the Chinook was directly related to the growth of the Huey and the Army's tacticians' insistence that initial air assaults be built around the squad. The Army pushed for both the Huey and the Chinook, and this focus was responsible for the acceleration of its air mobility effort.

Improved and later versions

Improved and more powerful versions of the CH-47 have been developed since the helicopter entered service. The U.S. Army's first major design leap was the now-common CH-47D, which entered service in 1982. Improvements from the CH-47C included upgraded engines, composite rotor blades, a redesigned cockpit to reduce pilot workload, improved and redundant electrical systems, an advanced flight control system, and improved avionics. The latest mainstream generation is the CH-47F, which features several major upgrades to reduce maintenance, digitized flight controls, and is powered by two  Honeywell engines.

A commercial model of the Chinook, the Boeing-Vertol Model 234, is used worldwide for logging, construction, fighting forest fires, and supporting petroleum extraction operations. In December 2006, Columbia Helicopters Inc purchased the type certificate of the Model 234 from Boeing. The Chinook has also been licensed to be built by companies outside the United States, such as Agusta (now AgustaWestland) in Italy and Kawasaki in Japan.

Operational history

Vietnam War

The Army finally settled on the larger Chinook as its standard medium-transport helicopter, and as of February 1966, 161 aircraft had been delivered to the Army. The 1st Cavalry Division had brought its organic Chinook battalion (three Chinook companies) when it arrived in 1965 and a separate aviation medium helicopter company, the 147th, had arrived in Vietnam on 29 November 1965. This latter company was initially placed in direct support of the 1st Infantry Division. CH-47 crews quickly learned to mount an M60 machine gun in each of the forward doors. Sometimes they also installed an M60 or M2 machine gun to fire from the rear cargo door.

The most spectacular mission in Vietnam for the Chinook was the placing of artillery batteries in perilous mountain positions inaccessible by any other means, and then keeping them resupplied with large quantities of ammunition. The 1st Cavalry Division found that its CH-47s were limited to a  payload when operating in the mountains, but could carry an additional  when operating near the coast. The early Chinook design was limited by its rotor system which did not permit full use of the installed power, and users were anxious for an improved version which would upgrade this system.

As with any new piece of equipment, the Chinook presented a major problem of "customer education". Commanders and crew chiefs had to be constantly alert that eager soldiers did not overload the temptingly large cargo compartment. It would be some time before troops would be experts at using sling loads. The Chinook soon proved to be such an invaluable aircraft for artillery movement and heavy logistics that it was seldom used as an assault troop carrier. Some of the Chinook fleet was used for casualty evacuation, and due to the very heavy demand for the helicopters, they were usually overburdened with wounded. Perhaps the most cost effective use of the Chinook was the recovery of other downed aircraft.

At the Vietnam war's peak the US Army had 21 Chinook companies in Vietnam. Pilots discovered the CH-47A's transmission system could not handle the two gas turbines running at full power, and high humidity and heat reduced the maximum lift by more than 20% in the low lands and 30% in mountain areas. More powerful, improved transmission and strengthened fuselages arrived in 1968 with the CH-47B, followed a few months later by the CH-47C. The CH-47s in Vietnam were generally armed with a single 7.62 mm M60 machine gun on a pintle mount on either side of the aircraft for self-defense, with stops fitted to keep the gunners from firing into the rotor blades. Dust filters were also added to improve engine reliability. Of the nearly 750 Chinook helicopters in the U.S. and South Vietnam fleets, about 200 were lost in combat or wartime operational accidents. The U.S. Army CH-47s supported the 1st Australian Task Force as required.

Four CH-47s were converted into ACH-47As by adding armor and improved engines. Its armament included two fixed forward firing M24A1 20mm cannons, one turret with 40 mm automatic grenade launcher on the nose, five .50 in machine guns and two weapon pods on the sides that could carry either XM159B/XM159C 70 mm rocket launchers or 7.62 mm miniguns. They arrived in Vietnam in 1966, and they engaged in six months of operational testing at An Khê Army Airfield. They performed well in combat, but its high maintenance costs and demand for use in troop and cargo transport was stronger. Three ACH-47s were lost. One collided with a CH-47 while taxiing. Another had a retention pin shake loose on a 20 mm cannon and was brought down when its own gun fired through the forward rotor blades. The third was grounded by enemy fire and destroyed by enemy mortar rounds after the crew escaped.

Iran
During the 1970s, the United States and Iran had a strong relationship, in which the Iranian armed forces began to use many American military aircraft, most notably the F-14 Tomcat, as part of a modernization program. After an agreement signed between Boeing and Agusta, the Imperial Iranian Air Force purchased 20 Agusta-built CH-47Cs in 1971. The Imperial Iranian Army Aviation purchased 70 CH-47Cs from Agusta between 1972 and 1976. In late 1978, Iran placed an order for an additional 50 helicopters with Elicotteri Meridionali, but that order was canceled immediately after the revolution; 11 of them were delivered after multiple requests by Iran.

In the 1978 Iranian Chinook shootdown, four Iranian CH-47Cs penetrated  into Soviet airspace in the Turkmenistan Military District. They were intercepted by a MiG-23M which shot down one, killing eight crew members, and forced a second one to land. Chinook helicopters were used in efforts by the Imperial Iranian loyalist forces to resist the 1979 Iranian revolution.

During the Iran–Iraq War, Iran made heavy use of its US-bought equipment, and lost at least eight CH-47s during the 1980–1988 period, most notably during a clash on 15 July 1983, when an Iraqi Mirage F1 destroyed three Iranian Chinooks transporting troops to the front line, and on 25–26 February 1984, when Iraqi MiG-21 fighters shot down two examples. On 22 March 1982, in Operation Fath ol-Mobin, a key operation of the war, Iranian Chinooks were landed behind Iraqi lines, deployed troops that silenced their artillery, and captured an Iraqi headquarters; the attack took the Iraqi forces by surprise.

Despite the arms embargo in place upon Iran, it has managed to keep its Chinook fleet operational. Some of the Chinooks have been rebuilt by Panha. As of 2015, 20 to 45 Chinooks were operational in Iran.

Libyan wars
In 1976, the Libyan Air Force purchased 24 Italian-built CH-47C helicopters, 14 of which were transferred to the Libyan Army during the 1990s. The Libyan Air Force recruited Western pilots and technicians to operate the CH-47 fleet. The Libyan Chinooks flew transport and support missions into Chad to supply Libyan ground forces operating there in the 1980s. Chinooks were occasionally used to transport Libyan special forces in assault missions in northern Chad.

In 2002, Libya sold 16 helicopters to the United Arab Emirates, as due to the Western embargo and lack of funds, maintaining them was difficult. The sale to UAE was a $939 million package that included equipment, parts, and training. How many CH-47s are still in existence or operational during the ongoing Libyan civil wars that started in 2011 is not known.

Falklands War

The Chinook was used both by Argentina and the United Kingdom during the Falklands War in 1982.

The Argentine Air Force and the Argentine Army each deployed two CH-47C helicopters, which were widely used in general transport duties. Of the Army's aircraft, one was destroyed on the ground by 30 mm cannon fire from an RAF GR3 Harrier, while the other was captured by the British and reused after the war. Both Argentine Air Force helicopters were returned to Argentina and remained in service until 2002.

Three British Chinooks were destroyed on 25 May 1982 when Atlantic Conveyor was struck by an Exocet sea-skimming missile fired by an Argentine Super Étendard. The sole surviving British Chinook, Bravo November, did outstanding service in the Falklands, lifting 81 troops on one occasion and is still in service 38 years later.

Afghanistan and Iraq wars

About 163 CH-47Ds of various operators were deployed to Saudi Arabia, Kuwait, and Iraq during Operation Desert Shield and the subsequent Operation Desert Storm in 1990–91.

The CH-47D has seen wide use in Operation Enduring Freedom in Afghanistan and Operation Iraqi Freedom in Iraq. The Chinook is being used in air assault missions, inserting troops into fire bases, and later bringing food, water, and ammunition. It is also the casualty evacuation aircraft of choice in the British Armed Forces. In combat theaters, it is typically escorted by attack helicopters such as the AH-64 Apache for protection. Its lift capacity has been found of particular value in the mountainous terrain of Afghanistan, where high altitudes and temperatures limit the use of helicopters such as the UH-60 Black Hawk; reportedly, one Chinook can replace up to five UH-60s in the air assault transport role.

The Chinook helicopters of several nations have participated in the Afghanistan War, including aircraft from Britain, Italy, the Netherlands, Spain, Canada, and Australia. Despite the age of the Chinook, it is still in heavy demand, in part due its proven versatility and ability to operate in demanding environments such as Afghanistan.

In May 2011, an Australian Army CH-47D crashed during a resupply mission in Zabul Province, resulting in one fatality and five survivors. The helicopter was unable to be recovered and was destroyed in place. To compensate for the loss, the ADF added two ex-U.S. Army CH-47Ds to the fleet which are expected to be in service until the introduction of the CH-47Fs in 2016.

On 6 August 2011, a Chinook crashed near Kabul, killing all of the 38 aboard. The Chinook was reportedly shot down with a rocket-propelled grenade by the Taliban while attempting to assist a group of U.S. Navy SEALs. The 38 were members of NATO and allied forces, including 22 Naval Special Warfare operators, five U.S. Army Aviation soldiers, three U.S. Air Force special operations personnel, and seven Afghan National Army commandos. A civilian translator and a U.S. military working dog were also killed in the crash. The crash was the single deadliest during the entire Operation Enduring Freedom campaign. The previous biggest single-day loss for American forces in Afghanistan involved a Chinook that was shot down near Kabul in Kunar Province in June 2005 with all aboard killed, including a 16-member U.S. Special Operations team.

Disaster relief
According to Suresh Abraham, the Chinook's ability to carry large, underslung loads has been of significant value in relief operations in the aftermath of natural disasters. Numerous operators have chosen to deploy their Chinook fleets to support humanitarian efforts in stricken nations overseas. Following the 2004 Asian tsunami, the Republic of Singapore Air Force assisted in the relief operations in neighboring Indonesia using its Chinooks; similarly, after the 2005 Kashmir earthquake, the Royal Air Force dispatched several Chinooks to Northern Pakistan to assist in recovery efforts.

In August 1992, six CH-47Ds were deployed from Fort Bragg in North Carolina to provide relief in the wake of Hurricane Andrew in what was one of the first major helicopter disaster relief operations on US soil. Then President George H. W. Bush ordered the military to assist. The Chinooks arrived at Miami-Opa Locka Executive Airport, just outside of the disaster zone, one day after the President's order; early on, they performed a wide loop over Homestead and Florida City to publicly display their presence, helping to curtail lawlessness and looting. The Chinooks initially flew twelve sorties per day out of Opa Locka, which expanded over time, often supporting distribution operations at Homestead AFB and Opa Locka, as well as delivering relief payloads via internal storage, not using sling loads, supplementing the two dozen distribution centers and trucks, proving essential as trucks could not reach the worst hit areas due to downed trees and power lines. They flew everyday for approximately three weeks, moving supplies and personnel around the disaster zone as well as carrying media and government officials, including then Congressman Bill Nelson. Ultimately, the Chinooks supplied 64 distribution sites throughout the zone and transported 1.2 million pounds of supplies before the urgent relief phase ended.

Three of Japan's CH-47s were used to cool Reactors 3 and 4 of the Fukushima Nuclear power plant following the 9.0 earthquake in 2011; they were used to collect sea water from the nearby ocean and drop it over the affected areas. In order to protect the crew from the heightened radiation levels present, a number of lead plates were attached to the floor of each Chinook; even with such measures, pilots had to keep their distance from the reactors while also limiting flight times in the vicinity to a maximum of 45 minutes to avoid excessive radiation exposure.

Other roles

Since the type's inception, the Chinook has carried out various secondary missions, including medical evacuation, disaster relief, search and rescue, aircraft recovery, fire fighting, and heavy construction assistance.

In February 2007, the Royal Netherlands Air Force became the first international customer of the CH-47F model, expanding their Chinook fleet to 17.  On 10 August 2009, Canada signed a contract for 15 extensively modified and upgraded CH-47Fs for the Canadian Forces, later delivered in 2013–2014 with the Canadian designation CH-147F. On 15 December 2009, Britain announced its Future Helicopter Strategy, including the purchase of 24 new CH-47Fs to be delivered from 2012. Australia ordered seven CH-47Fs in March 2010 to replace its six CH-47Ds between 2014 and 2017. In September 2015, India approved purchase of 15 CH-47F Chinooks. On 7 November 2016, Singapore announced that the CH-47F would replace its older Chinooks, which had been in service since 1994, enabling the Republic of Singapore Air Force to meet its requirements for various operations, including Search and Rescue (SAR), Aeromedical Evacuation (AME), and Humanitarian Assistance and Disaster Relief (HADR) operations.

In February 2020, the Indian Air Force started using Chinooks at theatres such as Ladakh and Siachen Glacier to assist Indian forces deployed at the Indian borders with China and Pakistan.

Variants

HC-1B
The pre-1962 designation for Model 114 development aircraft that would be redesignated CH-47 Chinook.

CH-47A
A total of 354 were built.

ACH-47A

The ACH-47A was originally known as the Armed/Armored CH-47A (or A/ACH-47A). It was officially designated ACH-47A as a U.S. Army Attack Cargo Helicopter, and unofficially referred to as Guns A Go-Go. Four CH-47A helicopters were converted to gunships by Boeing Vertol in late 1965. Three were assigned to the 53rd Aviation Detachment in South Vietnam for testing, with the remaining one retained in the U.S. for weapons testing. By 1966, the 53rd was redesignated the 1st Aviation Detachment (Provisional) and attached to the 228th Assault Support Helicopter Battalion of the 1st Cavalry Division (Airmobile). By 1968, only one gunship remained, and logistical concerns prevented more conversions. It was returned to the United States, and the program stopped.

The ACH-47A carried five 7.62 × 51 mm M60D machine guns or .50-caliber (12.7 mm) M2HB heavy machine guns, provided by the XM32 and XM33 armament subsystems, two 20 mm M24A1 cannons, two 19-tube  Folding Fin Aerial Rocket launchers (XM159B/XM159) or sometimes two M18/M18A1 7.62 × 51 mm gun pods, and a single 40 mm M75 grenade launcher in the XM5/M5 armament subsystem (more commonly seen on the UH-1 series of helicopters). Rare newsreel footage shows one of the aircraft in action supporting the 8th Cavalry Regiment during an ambush at Bông Son, South Vietnam. The surviving aircraft, Easy Money, has been restored and is on display at Redstone Arsenal, Alabama.

CH-47B
The CH-47B was an interim solution while Boeing worked on a more substantially improved CH-47C. The CH-47B was powered by two Lycoming T55-L-7C  engines. It featured a blunted rear rotor pylon, redesigned asymmetrical rotor blades, and strakes along the rear ramp and fuselage to improve flying characteristics. It could be equipped with two door-mounted M60D 7.62 mm NATO machine guns on the M24 armament subsystem and a ramp-mounted M60D using the M41 armament subsystem. Some CH-47 "bombers" were equipped to drop tear gas or napalm from the rear cargo ramp onto Viet Cong bunkers. The CH-47B could be equipped with a hoist and cargo hook. The Chinook proved especially valuable in "Pipe Smoke" aircraft recovery missions. The "Hook" recovered about 12,000 aircraft valued at over $3.6 billion during the war; 108 were built.

CH-47C

The CH-47C principally featured more powerful engines and transmissions. Three sub-versions were built; the first had Lycoming T55-L-7C engines delivering . The T55-L-11 engines suffered difficulties, as they had been hurriedly introduced to increase payload; thus, they were temporarily replaced by the more reliable Lycoming T55-L-7C. The type was distinguishable from the standard "C" by the uprated maximum gross weight.

The type was unable to receive FAA certification to engage in civil activities due to the nonredundant hydraulic flight boost system drive. A redesign of the hydraulic boost system drive was incorporated in the succeeding CH-47D, allowing that model to achieve certification as the Boeing Model 234. A total of 233 CH-47Cs were built. Canada bought a total of eight CH-47Cs; deliveries of the type began in 1974. Receiving the Canadian designation "CH-147", these were fitted with a power hoist above the crew door; other changes included a flight engineer station in the rear cabin: operators referred to the configuration as the "Super C". The CH-47C was used widely during the Vietnam War, eventually replacing the older Piasecki H-21 Shawnee in the combat assault support role.

CH-47D

The CH-47D shares the same airframe as earlier models, the main difference being the adoption of more powerful engines. Early CH-47Ds were originally powered by two T55-L-712 engines, the most common engine is the later T55-GA-714A. It was first introduced into service in 1979. In air assault operations, it often serves as the principal mover of the 155 mm M198 howitzer, accompanying 30 rounds of ammunition, and an 11-man crew. The CH-47D also has advanced avionics, such as the Global Positioning System. Nearly all US Army CH-47D were conversions from previous A, B, and C models, a total of 472 being converted. The last U.S. Army CH-47D built was delivered to the U.S. Army Reserve, located at Fort Hood, Texas, in 2002.

The Netherlands acquired all seven of the Canadian Forces' surviving CH-147Cs and upgraded them to CH-47D standard. Six more new-build CH-47Ds were delivered in 1995 for a total of 13. The Dutch CH-47Ds feature a number of improvements over U.S. Army CH-47Ds, including a long nose for Bendix weather radar, a "glass cockpit", and improved T55-L-714 engines. As of 2011, the Netherlands shall upgrade 11 of these which will be updated to the CH-47F standard at a later date. As of 2011, Singapore has 18 CH-47D/SDs, which includes twelve "Super D" Chinooks, in service. In 2008, Canada purchased 6 CH-47Ds from the U.S. for the Canadian Helicopter Force Afghanistan for $252 million. With 1 CH-47D lost to an accident, the remaining five were sold in 2011 after the end of Canada's mission in Afghanistan and replaced with seven CH-147Fs.

MH-47D
The MH-47D variant was developed for special forces operations and has inflight refueling capability, a fast rope-rappelling system, and other upgrades. The MH-47D was used by U.S. Army 160th Special Operations Aviation Regiment. Twelve MH-47D helicopters were produced. Six were conversions from CH-47A models and six were conversions from CH-47C models.

MH-47E

The MH-47E has been used by U.S. Army Special Operations. Beginning with the E-model prototype manufactured in 1991, a total of 26 Special Operations Aircraft were produced. All aircraft were assigned to 2–160th SOAR(A) "Nightstalkers", home based at Fort Campbell, Kentucky. E models were conversions from existing CH-47C model airframes. The MH-47E has similar capabilities as the MH-47D, but includes an increased fuel capacity similar to the CH-47SD and terrain following/terrain avoidance radar.

In 1995, the Royal Air Force ordered eight Chinook HC3s, effectively a low-cost version of the MH-47E for the special operations role. They were delivered in 2001, but never entered operational service due to technical issues with their avionics fit, unique to the HC3. In 2008, work started to revert the HC3s to HC2 standard, to enable them to enter service. They have since been upgraded to HC5 standard with a digital automated flight control system.

CH-47F

In 2001, the first CH-47F, an upgraded CH-47D, made its maiden flight; the first production model rolled out on 15 June 2006 at Boeing's facility in Ridley Park, Pennsylvania, and first flew on 23 October 2006. Upgrades include  Honeywell engines and the airframe featuring greater single-piece construction to lower maintenance requirements. The milled construction reduces vibration, as well as inspection and repair needs, and eliminates flexing points to increase service life. New avionics include a Rockwell Collins Common Avionics Architecture System (CAAS) cockpit, and BAE Systems' Digital Advanced Flight Control System (DAFCS). AgustaWestland assembles the CH-47F under license, known as the Chinook ICH-47F, for several customers. Boeing delivered 48 CH-47Fs to the U.S. Army through August 2008; at that time Boeing announced a $4.8 billion contract with the Army for 191 Chinooks.

A CH-47F Block 2 is planned to be introduced after 2020. It features the composite-based Advanced Chinook Rotor Blade (derived from the cancelled RAH-66 Comanche), 20% more powerful Honeywell T55-715 engines, and the active parallel actuator system (APAS); the APAS enhances the digital advanced flight-control system, providing an exact torque split between the rotors for greater efficiency. Electrical capacity is increased by three 60 kVA generators. Part of the Block II upgrade was the Advanced Chinook Rotor Blades (ACRB), intended to improve lift performance in hot/high altitude conditions by 2,000 lb, after initially being trialed in 2020 ACRB testing was postponed by the US Army due to vibration issues. Boeing denied the Army's assertion that the vibration issues were a safety risk and believed it could be solved with dampeners. Testing resumed in 2021 but the Army ultimately decided against implementing the upgrade as the vibration issues persisted in the resumed testing, in addition the aft rotor blade was stalling when in a swept back position.

The U.S. Army plans for a Block 3 upgrade after 2025, which could include a new  class engine with boosted power capacity of the transmission and drive train developed under the future affordable turbine engine (FATE) program and a lengthened fuselage. The Future Vertical Lift program plans to begin replacing the Army's rotorcraft fleet in the mid-2030s, initially focusing on medium-lift helicopters, thus the CH-47 is planned to be in service beyond 2060, over 100 years after first entering service.

The German government announced in June 2022 that Boeing's CH-47F Chinook Block II standard range was selected as the winner of its heavy helicopter program to replace its Sikorsky CH-53G Sea Stallion fleet.

MH-47G 

The MH-47G Special Operations Aviation (SOA) version is currently being delivered to the U.S. Army. It is similar to the MH-47E, but features more sophisticated avionics including a digital Common Avionics Architecture System (CAAS). The CAAS is a common glass cockpit used by different helicopters such as MH-60K/Ls, CH-53E/Ks, and ARH-70As. The MH-47G also incorporates all of the new sections of the CH-47F.

The new modernization program improves MH-47D and MH-47E Special Operations Chinooks to the MH-47G design specs. A total of 25 MH-47E and 11 MH-47D aircraft were upgraded by the end of 2003. In 2002, the army announced plans to expand the Special Operations Aviation Regiment via an additional 12 MH-47G helicopters. The final MH-47G Chinook was delivered to the U.S. Army Special Operations Command on 10 February 2011. Modernization of MH-47D/E Chinooks to MH-47G standard is due for completion in 2015.

On 1 September 2020, Boeing announced that their Philadelphia plant had delivered the first example of the MH-47G Block II helicopter to U.S. Army Special Operations Command (USASOC), saying that the delivery was made "recently", and was "on time". This is the first MH-47G Block II from an initial order of 24, with a stated ultimate requirement for 69. The MH-47G Block II includes all of the improvements from the CH-47F Block II, as well as inflight refueling capability, a comprehensive defensive aids suite and low-level/adverse weather piloting aids, such as forward-looking infrared and multi-mode/terrain-following radar. It is armed with two 7.62 mm M134 Miniguns and two M240 7.62 mm machine guns.

The British MOD confirmed that while the U.S. does not currently export the model, the two countries are currently in discussion regarding the MH-47G. On 19 October 2018, the Defense Security Cooperation Agency notified Congress of a possible sale of 16 H-47 Chinooks (Extended Range) to the UK.

CH-47J

The CH-47J is a medium-transport helicopter for the Japan Ground Self-Defense Force (JGSDF), and the Japan Air Self-Defense Force (JASDF). The differences between the CH-47J and the CH-47D are the engine, rotor brake and avionics, for use for general transportation, SAR and disaster activity like U.S. forces. The CH-47JA, introduced in 1993, is a long-range version of the CH-47J, fitted with an enlarged fuel tank, an AAQ-16 FLIR in a turret under the nose, and a partial glass cockpit. Both versions are built under license in Japan by Kawasaki Heavy Industries, who produced 61 aircraft by April 2001.

The Japan Defense Agency ordered 54 aircraft of which 39 were for the JGSDF and 15 were for the JASDF. Boeing supplied flyable aircraft, to which Kawasaki added full avionics, interior, and final paint. The CH-47J model Chinook (N7425H) made its first flight in January 1986, and it was sent to Kawasaki in April. Boeing began delivering five CH-47J kits in September 1985 for assembly at Kawasaki.

HH-47
On 9 November 2006, the HH-47, a new variant of the Chinook based on the MH-47G, was selected by the U.S. Air Force as the winner of the Combat Search and Rescue (CSAR-X) competition. Four development HH-47s were to be built, with the first of 141 production aircraft planned to enter service in 2012. However, in February 2007 the contract award was protested and the GAO ordered the CSAR-X project to be re-bid. The CSAR-X program was again terminated in 2009. In February 2010, the USAF announced plans to replace aging HH-60G helicopters, and deferred secondary combat search and rescue requirements calling for a larger helicopter.

Sea Chinook 

For years the U.S. Navy has been operating different versions of the single-rotor CH-53 helicopter as its heavy-lift helicopter. CH-47s regularly conduct ship-based operations for U.S. Special Forces and other international operators. Due to budget issues, technical problems and delays with CH-53K, the director of the Pentagon's cost assessment office directed US Navy to consider maritime versions of CH-47. Naval versions must be protected against the corrosive seaborne environment and be able to operate from aircraft carriers and amphibious ships.

Other export models

 The Royal Air Force version of the CH-47C is designated Chinook HC1; its versions of the CH-47D are designated Chinook HC2 and HC2A.
 The export version of the CH-47C Chinook for the Italian Army was designated "CH-47C Plus".
 The HH-47D is a search and rescue version for the Republic of Korea Air Force. 
 The CH-47DG is an upgraded version of the CH-47C for Greece. 
 While the CH-47SD (also known as the "Super D") is a modified variant for Singapore of the CH-47D, with extended range fuel tanks and higher payload carrying capacity; the CH-47SD is currently in use by the Republic of Singapore Air Force, Hellenic Army and the Republic of China Army.
 Eight CH-47Cs were delivered to the Canadian Forces in 1974. These helicopters were in Canadian service until 1991, with the designation CH-147. These aircraft were subsequently sold to the Netherlands and operated by the Royal Netherlands Air Force as CH-47Ds. All aircraft were phased out in 2021 and replaced by CH-47Fs.

Civilian models

 Model 234LR (long range): Commercial transport helicopter. The Model 234LR can be fitted out as an all-passenger, all-cargo, or cargo/passenger transport helicopter.
 Model 234ER (extended range): Commercial transport version.
 Model MLR (multi-purpose long range): Commercial transport version.
 Model 234UT (utility transport): Utility transport helicopter.
 Model 414: The Model 414 is the international export version of the CH-47D. It is also known as the CH-47D International Chinook.
 CU-47: Built by Unical from parts from ex-Canadian Forces CH-47D/CH-147D for Coulson Aviation to be used for aerial firefighting. One delivered in 2020 with 11 others to be delivered.

Derivatives

In 1969, work on the experimental BV-347 was begun. It was a CH-47A with a lengthened fuselage, four-blade rotors, detachable wings mounted on top of the fuselage and other changes. It first flew on 27 May 1970 and was evaluated for a few years.

In 1973, the Army contracted with Boeing to design a "Heavy Lift Helicopter" (HLH), designated XCH-62A. It appeared to be a scaled-up CH-47 without a conventional body, in a configuration similar to the S-64 Skycrane (CH-54 Tarhe), but the project was canceled in 1975. The program was restarted for test flights in the 1980s and was again not funded by Congress. The scaled-up model of the HLH was scrapped in late 2005 at Fort Rucker, Alabama.

Operators

Australian Army

Royal Canadian Air Force

Republic of China Army
National Fire Agency

Egyptian Air Force

Hellenic Army

Indian Air Force

Indonesian National Board for Disaster Management

Islamic Republic of Iran Army

Italian Army

Japan Air Self-Defense Force operates 15 CH-47Js as of March 2022.
Japan Ground Self-Defense Force operates 47 CH-47J/JAs as of March 2022.

 

Republic of Korea Army

Libyan Air Force

Royal Moroccan Air Force

Royal Netherlands Air Force

 Royal Saudi Land Forces

Republic of Singapore Air Force

Spanish Army Airmobile Force

Turkish Army

United Arab Emirates Air Force

Royal Air Force 

United States Army
Army National Guard
United States Army Reserve

Former operators

Argentina

Argentine Air Force
Argentine Army

Australia
Royal Australian Air Force (later transferred to the Australian Army)

South Vietnam
Republic of Vietnam Air Force

Thailand
Royal Thai Army

United Kingdom
British Airways Helicopters

United States

NASA

Vietnam
Vietnam People's Air Force

Accidents 

On 4 May 1966 , a CH-47A crashed near Di Linh, Lâm Đồng Province killing all 20 onboard. 
 On 26 December 1967, a CH-47A carrying 33 military passengers and crew crashed in a landing descent at Phu Cat AFB, Binh Dinh Province, South Vietnam killing 8 of those on board.
 On 18 August 1971, CH-47A, airframe , was operated by the 4th Aviation Company, 15th Aviation Group. The helicopter was transporting 33 soldiers of the Heavy Mortar Platoon, 2nd Battalion, 4th Infantry Regiment, 56th Field Artillery Brigade from battalion headquarters in Ludwigsburg to Grafenwöhr for live fire training exercises. Fatigue failure of the rear rotor blade led to its separation causing structural damage resulting in the crash and explosion that killed all 37 on board, including four crew members. A memorial plaque that was placed near the crash site in the forest outside Pegnitz was stolen in 2009.
 On 28 November 1971, a CH-47C carrying five crew and 28 soldiers from the 101st Airborne Division on a flight from Da Nang to Phu Bai Combat Base, South Vietnam crashed into high ground killing all onboard.
 On 18 October 1974, a CH-47C, US serial 74-22058 assigned 147001 but was never marked with Canadian Forces. The aircraft was lost on its delivery flight to Canada following gear failure in main combining gear box, caused by undetected metal infraction in gear blank before machining. This failure led to drive shaft failure and loss of synchronization and resulted in five fatalities. After a lengthy litigation, it was replaced by 147009.
 On 11 September 1982 at an airshow in Mannheim, Germany, a U.S. Army Chinook (serial number 74-22292) carrying parachutists crashed, killing 46 people. The crash was later found to have been caused by an accumulation of ground walnut shell grit used for cleaning machinery, which blocked lubrication from reaching transmission bearings. The accident resulted in the eventual discontinuation of the use of walnut grit as a cleaning agent.
 On 4 February 1985, a Royal Australian Air Force (RAAF) CH-47C (A15-001) crashed into Perseverance Dam, Toowoomba, Queensland, Australia. The Royal Air Force (RAF) exchange pilot was rescued from the submerged cockpit but later died in hospital.
 On 6 November 1986, a British International Helicopters Chinook crashed on approach to Sumburgh Airport, Shetland Islands resulting in the loss of 45 lives and the withdrawal of the Chinook from crew-servicing flights in the North Sea.
 On 30 October 1997, a civilian BV234UT operated by Columbia Helicopters (registration C-FHFH) engaged in logging operations crashed on Vancouver Island, Canada, killing both of the pilots. The investigation determined that the helicopter lost yaw control due to failure of flight control computer.
 On 1 March 1991, Major Marie Therese Rossi Cayton was killed when her U.S. Army Chinook helicopter crashed after colliding with a microwave tower during a dust storm. She was the first American woman to fly in combat during Desert Storm in 1991.
 On 2 June 1994, an RAF CH-47 carrying 25 British MI5, police, and military intelligence experts and 4 crew, flew from Northern Ireland to Scotland for a conference crashed on the Mull of Kintyre
 On 29 May 2001, a Republic of Korea Army (ROK Army) CH-47D installing a sculpture onto Olympic Bridge in Seoul, South Korea failed to unlatch the sculpture. The helicopter's rotors struck the monument; then the fuselage hit and broke into two. One section crashed onto the bridge in flames and the other fell into the river. All three crew members on board died.
 On 22 February 2002, a U.S. Army special forces MH-47E crashed at sea in the Philippines, killing all ten U.S. soldiers on board.
 On 11 September 2004, a Hellenic Army Aviation CH-47SD crashed into the sea off Mount Athos. All 17 people on board were killed, including four senior figures in the Greek Orthodox Church of Alexandria.
 On 6 April 2005, the U.S. Army CH-47D known as "Big Windy 25" crashed during a sandstorm near Ghazni, Afghanistan, killing all eighteen aboard (fifteen soldiers and three contractors). The pilots had been disoriented by the dust storm.
 On 7 January 2013, a BV-234 N241CH owned by Columbia Helicopters, crashed shortly after taking off from the airport in Pucallpa, Coronel Portillo Province, Peru. All seven crew members were killed.

Aircraft on display

Argentina
H-91 - CH-47C on display at the Museo Nacional de Aeronáutica de Argentina in Morón, Buenos Aires.

Australia
A15-104 - CH-47D on display at the Australian Army Flying Museum in Oakey, Queensland.

Canada
147201 - CH-47D on display at the National Air Force Museum of Canada in Trenton, Ontario.
147206 - CH-47D preserved as a gate guardian at CFB Petawawa.

Italy

MM80840 - CH-47C on display at Volandia in Somma Lombardo.

United Kingdom
83-24104 - Former US Army CH-47D forward section on display at Royal Air Force Museum London, modified to represent "Bravo November".

United States
59-4984 - YCH-47B on display at the U.S. Army Transportation Museum in Fort Eustis, Virginia.
60-3451 - CH-47A on display at the United States Army Aviation Museum in Fort Rucker, Alabama.
61-2408 - CH-47A on display in a park across the street from the Don F. Pratt Memorial Museum in Fort Campbell, Kentucky.
64-13149 - ACH-47A on display at the Redstone Arsenal in Alabama.
65-7992 - Model 347 on display at the United States Army Aviation Museum in Fort Rucker, Alabama.
85-24346 - CH-47D on display at the Combat Air Museum on Topeka Regional Airport (Forbes Field) in Topeka, Kansas.
89-00153 - CH-47D on display at Castle Air Museum in Atwater, California.
90-00222 - CH-47D on display outside at Fort Knox, Kentucky.

Vietnam
65-8025 - CH-47A on display at the Khe Sanh Combat Museum.
66-0086 - CH-47A on display at the War Remnants Museum in Ho Chi Minh City.
66-19082 - CH-47A on display at the Vietnam Military History Museum in Hanoi.

Specifications (CH-47F)

See also

References

External links

 
 MH-47E/G, CH-47 history, and Model 234 Chinook history pages on Boeing.com
 CH-47A/B/C, ACH-47A, CH-47D/F and CH-47 Chinook pages on Army.mil
 CH-47 page on Vectorsite.net
 "Boeing's New Combat-Ready CH-47F Chinook Helicopter Fielded to First US Army Unit"
 Italian Chinooks – CASR Article
 The Kopp-Etchells Effect – CH-47 Night Landings in Afghanistan . Michael Yon online magazine
 

Aircraft first flown in 1961
Boeing military aircraft
Kawasaki Aerospace Company
Military transport helicopters
Boeing CH-47 Chinook
Tandem rotor helicopters
1960s United States military transport aircraft
1960s United States helicopters
Twin-turbine helicopters